These are the results of the men's C-2 1000 metres competition in canoeing at the 1952 Summer Olympics. The C-2 event is raced by two-man sprint canoes. Because there were eleven teams in this event, heats were introduced. Both the heats and final took place on July 28.

Medalists

Heats
The 11 teams first raced in two heats.  The top four teams in each heat advanced directly to the final.

Heat 1

Heat 2

Final

References

1952 Summer Olympics official report. p. 634.
Sports reference.com 1952 C-2 1000 m results

Men's C-2 1000
Men's events at the 1952 Summer Olympics